Nicky McCrimmon (born March 22, 1972) is a retired WNBA basketball player who was on the Los Angeles Sparks between 2000 to 2003. Before joining the Sparks, McCrimmon played basketball on the New Mexico Junior College and University of Southern California teams. During her varsity career, McCrimmon played at the 1993 NCAA Division I women's basketball tournament and the 1994 NCAA Division I women's basketball tournament with USC. After college, McCrimmon was on several teams in the American Basketball League from 1997 to 1998.

With the Sparks from 2000 to 2003, McCrimmon had 284 points during her 125 regular season games. In playoff games, McCrimmon won the 2001 WNBA Championship and 2002 WNBA Championship as a member of the Sparks. In 2005, McCrimmon ended her basketball career after being released from the Houston Comets on two separate occasions. Apart from basketball, McCrimmon worked in project management and also was a substitute teacher.

Early life and education
McCrimmon was born in Manhattan, New York on March 22, 1972. Growing up, McCrimmon played basketball in Harlem and continued to play while in high school. From 1990 to 1992, McCrimmon was on the New Mexico Junior College women's basketball team. During her time at the junior college, McCrimmon had 988 points and became second for the most career points at NMJC. She was also named player of the year for the Western Junior College Athletic Conference in 1992. 

After continuing her education with the University of Southern California in 1992, McCrimmon was on the USC Trojans women's basketball from 1992 to 1994. While on the team, McCrimmon and USC made it to the regional semifinals at the 1993 NCAA Division I women's basketball tournament and the regional finals at the 1994 NCAA Division I women's basketball tournament. Overall, McCrimmon led in assists for USC during the 1992 and 1993 seasons. Apart from basketball, McCrimmon studied communications and sociology during her time at USC.

Career
In April 1997, McCrimmon joined the Long Beach Stingrays when the team became part of the American Basketball League. Later that year, McCrimmon was traded to the Atlanta Glory in November 1997. The following year, McCrimmon worked at an insurance company in Phoenix, Arizona as an intern while part of the Seattle Reign.

At the 2000 WNBA draft, McCrimmon was drafted by the Los Angeles Sparks during the fourth round. While playing for the Sparks between 2000 to 2003, McCrimmon had 284 points and 96 rebounds during 125 regular season games. At the WNBA playoffs, McCrimmon and the Sparks won the 2001 WNBA Championship and 2002 WNBA Championship. In 2003, McCrimmmon played in seven playoff games before her team was defeated by the Detroit Shock in the 2003 WNBA Finals.

In February 2004, McCrimmon joined the Houston Comets as a free agent. After appearing in a preseason game in May 2004, McCrimmon requested to be released from the Comets. In March 2005, McCrimmon returned to the Comets as a free agent. That year, McCrimmon was on the roster for the Comets' training camp before being cut from the team in May 2005. Apart from her playing career, McCrimmon co-established a basketball company called Play Mode in 2003. During the mid 2000s in Lancaster, California, McCrimmon worked in project management for a group home while also becoming a substitute teacher.

Career statistics

College

Regular season

|-
| style="text-align:left;"|2000
| style="text-align:left;"|Los Angeles
| 32 || 0 || 15.3 || .506 || .485 || .500 || 1.0 || 2.0 || 0.9 || 0.3 || 1.5 || 3.2
|-
| style="text-align:left;background:#afe6ba;"|2001†
| style="text-align:left;"|Los Angeles
| 28 || 0 || 12.5 || .444 || .417 || .429 || 0.4 || 2.3 || 0.8 || 0.0 || 0.8 || 2.3
|-
| style="text-align:left;background:#afe6ba;"|2002†
| style="text-align:left;"|Los Angeles
| 32 || 0 || 11.1 || .408 || .267 || .636 || 0.7 || 1.7 || 0.7 || 0.1 || 0.8 || 1.6
|-
| style="text-align:left;"|2003
| style="text-align:left;"|Los Angeles
| 33 || 1 || 9.1 || .444 || .417 || .875 || 0.9 || 1.0 || 0.6 || 0.0 || 0.5 || 2.1
|-
| style="text-align:left;"|Career
| style="text-align:left;"|4 years, 1 team
| 125 || 1 || 11.9 || .456 || .417 || .600 || 0.8 || 1.7 || 0.7 || 0.1 || 0.9 || 2.3

Playoffs

|-
| style="text-align:left;"|2000
| style="text-align:left;"|Los Angeles
| 4 || 0 || 12.3 || .250 || .250 || .750 || 1.8 || 2.5 || 0.3 || 0.0 || 1.3 || 2.5
|-
| style="text-align:left;background:#afe6ba;"|2001†
| style="text-align:left;"|Los Angeles
| 7 || 0 || 5.9 || .500 || 1.000 || .500 || 0.6 || 0.9 || 0.7 || 0.0 || 0.6 || 0.7
|-
| style="text-align:left;background:#afe6ba;"|2002†
| style="text-align:left;"|Los Angeles
| 5 || 0 || 4.4 || .429 || .500 || 1.000 || 0.2 || 0.4 || 0.4 || 0.0 || 0.2 || 1.6
|-
| style="text-align:left;"|2003
| style="text-align:left;"|Los Angeles
| 7 || 0 || 7.7 || .222 || .167 || .000 || 0.6 || 1.0 || 0.3 || 0.0 || 0.6 || 1.3
|-
| style="text-align:left;"|Career
| style="text-align:left;"|4 years, 1 team
| 23 || 0 || 7.2 || .282 || .308 || .667 || 0.7 || 1.1 || 0.4 || 0.0 || 0.6 || 1.4

References

USC Trojans women's basketball players
Long Beach Stingrays players
Atlanta Glory players
Seattle Reign (basketball) players
Los Angeles Sparks players
Living people
1972 births